Caloptilia flavella is a moth of the family Gracillariidae. It is known from Canada (Nova Scotia and Québec) and the United States (Connecticut, Maine and Vermont).

The larvae feed on Myrica caroliniensis, Myrica cerifera and Myrica gale. They mine the leaves of their host plant.

References

flavella
Moths of North America
Moths described in 1915